

Multi-discipline events 

 Summer Olympics: Kanal 5, Kanal 9
 Winter Olympics: Kanal 5, Kanal 9
 Paralympics: Sveriges Television

American Football 
NFL: TV12 and  Sportkanalen

Athletics
 IAAF World Championships: Sveriges Television and TV4
 IAAF Diamond League: Sveriges Television and TV4
 IAAF World Indoor Tour: Sveriges Television
 European Athletics Championships: Sveriges Television
 European Athletics Indoor Championships: Sveriges Television
 European Team Championships: Sveriges Television

Bandy
 Bandy World Championship: Sveriges Television
 Elitserien: Aftonbladet

Baseball
 Major League Baseball: Viasat

Basketball
 EuroBasket : TV10
 EuroBasket Women : TV10
 Euroleague: Viasat
 National Basketball Association (NBA): Viasat
 Svenska Basketligan: Sveriges Television

Boxing
Dream Boxing: DAZN: October 2022 to October 2025, all fights

Cycling 

 Vuelta a España: Eurosport
 Tour de France: Eurosport
 Giro d'Italia: Eurosport
 Tour de Suisse: Eurosport

Floorball
 World Floorball Championships: Sveriges Television
 Swedish Super League: Expressen

Football
 FIFA World Cup: SVT, TV4
 FIFA World Cup qualification: TV6
 FIFA Women's World Cup: TV6
FIFA Club World Cup: Aftonbladet
UEFA Euro: SVT, TV4
UEFA Women's Euro: SVT, TV4
UEFA Nations League: TV6
UEFA European Championship qualification: TV6
UEFA U-19 Euro: SVT
UEFA Women's U-19 Euro: SVT
UEFA U-17 Euro: SVT
UEFA Women's U-17 Euro: SVT

Swedish International Matches, Leagues and Cups:
Sweden men's internationals:TV4
Sweden Women's internationals:SVT, TV6
Sweden Men's U-21: Sportkanalen
Allsvenskan: Kanal 5, Telia
Superettan: Telia
Damallsvenskan: TV6
Svenska Cupen: C More
Leagues:

UEFA Champions League: Telia
UEFA Super Cup: Telia
UEFA Youth League: Telia
UEFA Europa League: TV6
Premier League: TV6
Serie A: C More
La Liga: C More
Major League Soccer: Cmore
Eliteserien: Discovery+
Ligue 1:Expressen
Scottish Premiership: Viasat
Football League Championship: Viasat
UEFA Women's Champions League: DAZN
Danish Superliga: Viasat
Bundesliga: Viasat
Eredivisie: Viasat
Ekstraklasa: TBA
Russian Premier League: YouTube (pay)
J-League: YouTube (live coverage for J2 and cup matches only, plus highlights of all three leagues and a cup matches)
K-League: YouTube (one match per week via COPA90)

Cups:

Africa Cup of Nations: TBA
FA Cup: Viasat
FA Community Shield: Viasat
Copa América: TV10
Coppa Italia: Aftonbladet
CONCACAF Gold Cup: TBA
International Champions Cup: TBA
CONMEBOL Libertadores:TBA
Coupe de France: TBA
RFEF: Aftonbladet (for Copa del Rey) and TBA (for Supercopa)
DFB-Pokal: Viasat
DFL-Supercup: Viasat

Golf 

 PGA Championship: Kanal 9
 Ryder Cup: Viasat
 U.S. Open (golf): Viasat

Handball
 World Handball Championship: TV6
 European Handball Championship: TV6
 Sweden men's internationals: TV6
 Men's Elitserien: Sportkanalen
 Women's Elitserien: Sportkanalen
EHF Champions League: Viasat
EHF European League: Viasat
Bundesliga: Viasat

Ice hockey
 World Men's Championships: TV6
 World Women's Championships: SVT
 World Junior Championships: SVT, TV6
 Champions Hockey League: SVT
 National Hockey League (NHL): Viasat
 Swedish Hockey League (SHL): C More, (playoffs)
 HockeyAllsvenskan: Cmore
TV Pucken: SVT

Kickboxing
King of Kings: DAZN: October 2022 to October 2025, all fights

Mixed Martial Arts
Bushido MMA: DAZN: October 2022 to October 2025, all fights
CAGE MMA Finland: Viaplay

Motorsport
 MotoGP: Viasat
 Formula 1: Viasat
 Formula E: Eurosport
 STCC: Sportkanalen

Speedway
 Speedway Grand Prix: TV10
 Elitserien: Sportkanalen

Tennis 

 Stockholm Open: SVT
 Australian Open: Eurosport
 US Open: Eurosport
 French Open: Eurosport
 Wimbledon: Kanal 9
 ATP Tour Masters 1000: Eurosport
 WTA Tour: C More

Winter sports
 FIS Nordic World Ski Championships: TV6
 FIS Alpine World Ski Championships: TV6
 FIS Alpine Ski World Cup: TV6
 FIS Cross-Country World Cup: TV6
FIS Ski Jumping World Cup: TV6
Biathlon World Championships: Sveriges Television
 Biathlon World Cup: Sveriges Television
 Ski Classics: Sveriges Television
 Vasaloppet: Sveriges Television

Sweden
Sports television in Sweden